An Asian record may refer to:

Sports
List of Asian records in athletics
List of Asian records in swimming
List of Asian records in track cycling
List of Asian records in weightlifting

Multi-sport events
List of Asian Games records in athletics
List of Asian Games records in swimming
List of Asian Games records in track cycling
List of Asian Games records in weightlifting
List of Asian Indoor Games records in athletics

Championships
List of Asian Athletics Championships records
List of Asian Indoor Athletics Championships records